Passport to Danger is a Hardy Boys Mystery Stories novel.  It is the 179th book in the series and was first published in 2003 by Aladdin Paperbacks.

Plot summary
On vacation in Paris, Frank and Joe Hardy volunteer at a soccer stadium where the World Cup was recently held. There are so many "accidents" that they soon suspect sabotage. Their investigation uncovers a plot to attack the city.

References

External links

Passport to Danger by Franklin W. Dixon at Fantastic Fiction

The Hardy Boys books
2003 American novels
2003 children's books
Novels set in Paris